Vietnam competed in the 2021 Southeast Asian Games in Hanoi as host nation from 12 to 23 May 2022. The Vietnamese contingent consists of 965 athletes, competing in all 40 sports.

The host Vietnam emerged in the medal tally as the overall champions after nineteen years recording 205 gold medals (the most by any country thus far) along with 125 silvers and 106 bronzes, accumulating 446 total medals in total.

Medal summary

Medal by sport

Medal by date

Medalists

Diving 

Vietnam will be sending a total of 9 divers.

Men

Women

Football

Summary

Men's
Head coach:  Park Hang-seo

Notes
OA Over-aged player

Group A

Gymnastics

Artistic gymnastics
Men

Women

Handball

Beach handball

Kickboxing 

Men

Women

References

2022 in Vietnamese sport
2021
Nations at the 2021 Southeast Asian Games